Cesarino Cervellati (15 February 1930 – 13 April 2018) was an Italian footballer and manager from Baricella in the Province of Bologna, who played as a forward, usually as a right winger.

Club career
Cervellati was a one club man in the truest sense of the term, spending fourteen seasons as a player at his home province side Bologna. He made his Serie A debut with the club on 21 November 1948, in an 8–2 away defeat to Lazio. Between 1948 and 1962, he scored 88 league goals for the team in 300 appearances, winning a Mitropa Cup title in 1961.

International career
Cervellati represented Italy at international level on 6 occasions between 1951 and 1961; he made his debut on 6 May 1951, in a 0–0 home draw against Yugoslavia.

After retirement
After retiring from the playing field, Cervellati was known to keep in touch with his roots at Bologna, going on to have five managerial spells at the club where he is considered in such high regard; he won a Serie A title with the club in 1964, serving as an assistant manager to Fulvio Bernardini.

Honours

Player
Bologna
Mitropa Cup: 1961

Assistant manager
Serie A: 1963–64

References

1930 births
2018 deaths
Italian footballers
Italy international footballers
Serie A players
Bologna F.C. 1909 players
Italian football managers
Bologna F.C. 1909 managers
Association football midfielders
Sportspeople from the Metropolitan City of Bologna